Oxana Juravel (born 23 February 1986) is a Moldovan long-distance runner who specializes in the 3000 metres steeplechase.

She competed at the 2008 Olympic Games, but without reaching the final.

Her personal best time is 9:46.88 minutes, achieved in June 2008 in Banská Bystrica.

External links 

 

1986 births
Living people
Moldovan female long-distance runners
Athletes (track and field) at the 2008 Summer Olympics
Olympic athletes of Moldova
Moldovan female steeplechase runners
World Athletics Championships athletes for Moldova